Gownamordi (also Romanized as Gownamordī) is a village in Byaban Rural District, Byaban District, Minab County, Hormozgan Province, Iran. At the 2006 census, its population was 1,334, in 220 families.

References 

Populated places in Minab County